The 2021 Algerian League Cup Final was the 5th final of the Algerian League Cup. The final took place on August 10, 2021, at Stade du 5 Juillet in Algiers with kick-off at 19:00 between NC Magra and JS Kabylie. The match ended with JS Kabylie winning 4–1 on penalties, which is the first title in the club’s history in this competition and guarantees participation in the 2021–22 CAF Confederation Cup.

Road to the final

Match

Pre-match 
Twenty-two years after the last version of the Algerian League Cup that was played in the 1999–2000 season and because of the cancellation of the Algerian Cup, an exception only for this season due to COVID-19 pandemic in Algeria, the final played between JS Kabylie and NC Magra both of them have never reached the final before. JS Kabylie’s career was not difficult, and on the way to the final where they eliminated NA Hussein Dey, US Biskra and WA Tlemcen, unlike NC Magra who played against big clubs, CS Constantine, CR Belouizdad, JS Saoura, and finally USM Alger. the match led by international referee  Mustapha Ghorbal and the match was expected to be broadcast on Télévision Algérienne, but due to the great fires that Algeria witnessed especially in the Kabylie region, it was decided not to broadcast the match neither on Télévision Algérienne nor on Radio Algeria, JS Kabylie decided to enter With black badges to mourn the victims who were in the dozens.

Summary

Match details

Notes

References

Cup